Aldisa alabastrina is a species of sea slug, a dorid nudibranch, a marine gastropod mollusc in the family Cadlinidae.

Distribution
This species was described from under stones on the shore at San Diego Bay, California, United States.

References

Cadlinidae
Gastropods described in 1863
Taxa named by James Graham Cooper